Grace Saif (born 7 October 1995) is a British actress known for playing Ani Achola in 13 Reasons Why.

Early life and education 
Saif was born and grew up in Manchester before she moved to Crawley and attended Hazelwick School. After completing her A-levels, Saif earned a Bachelor of Arts degree in acting from the Royal Academy of Dramatic Art, where she received a bursary from the BAFTA for £4,500. Her BAFTA mentor was Billie Piper and she graduated from RADA in 2017.

Career 
Saif made an acting debut in Wilton, a short film directed by Cecile Emeke. In 2017, Saif appeared in an episode of the BBC's soap opera, Doctors.

In 2018, Saif appeared in another short film and voiced a character in World of Warcraft: Battle for Azeroth. Saif also performed at Donmar Warehoues in David Harrower's rendition of The Prime of Miss Jean Brodie.

Beginning in 2019, Saif appeared in seasons three and four of 13 Reasons Why.

In 2020, Saif was cast in a short film called The Visit, directed by Ebele Tate. She took part in a Right Here Festival event on 29 January 2020 commissioned by Crawley Creatives. Saif participated in the Jermyn Street Theatre's The Sonnet Project, which also featured Olivia Colman to Helena Bonham Carter, were she performed a rendition of Shakespeare's Sonnet 62.

Personal life 

In 2019, Saif deleted her social media accounts after facing online bullying. The accounts were later restored.

Filmography

Television

Theatre

Video games

Awards and nominations

References

External links
 

Living people
1995 births
21st-century English actresses
Actresses from Manchester
Alumni of RADA
Black British actresses
English film actresses
English people of Kenyan descent
English television actresses
English voice actresses
People educated at Hazelwick School
People from Crawley